Kimberly Po-Messerli and Nathalie Tauziat were the defending champions, but Tauziat did not compete this year. Po-Messerli teamed up with Corina Morariu and lost in semifinals to tournament winners Kim Clijsters and Jelena Dokic.

Clijsters and Dokic defeated Daniela Hantuchová and Ai Sugiyama 6–3, 6–3 in the final. It was the 3rd title for Clijsters and the 3rd title for Dokic in their respective doubles careers. It was also the 1st and only title for both players as a pair.

Seeds

Draw

Draw

References
 Main and Qualifying Draws

2002 WTA Tour
LA Women's Tennis Championships